Potkrajci may refer to:
 Potkrajci, Bijelo Polje, Montenegro
 Potkrajci, Pljevlja, Montenegro